Rehoboth Presbyterian Church is a historic Presbyterian church located at Westover, Maryland in Somerset County near the Pocomoke River and Chesapeake Bay.

William Stevens, an influential Somerset County citizen and member of the established Church of England (attending at the nearby Coventry Parish Ruins) issued a call to the Reverend Francis Makemie (1658–1708), an Ulster Scots clergyman who arrived in the colony and became known as the "Father of American Presbyterianism."

The old church is a simple one-story Flemish bond brick building, three bays wide by three deep, constructed about 1706. It was remodeled in 1888, and the original clear glass windows were replaced with the present leaded ones. The interior features a barrel-vault wooden ceiling, box pews with single raised panel on the ends, and a paneled gallery. A cemetery surrounds it, and several other buildings in complementary styles were erected nearby.

It was listed on the National Register of Historic Places in 1974.

References

External links

, including undated photo, at Maryland Historical Trust
 

Presbyterian churches in Maryland
Churches on the National Register of Historic Places in Maryland
Churches in Somerset County, Maryland
Churches completed in 1706
Scotch-Irish American culture in Maryland
1706 establishments in Maryland
18th-century Presbyterian church buildings in the United States
National Register of Historic Places in Somerset County, Maryland